YDbDr, sometimes written YDBDR, is the colour space used in the SECAM analog terrestrial colour television broadcasting standard (adopted in France and some countries of  the former Eastern Bloc) and PAL-N (adopted in Argentina, Paraguay and Uruguay).  It is very close to YUV (used on the PAL system) and its related colour spaces such as YIQ (used on the NTSC system), YPbPr and YCbCr.

Formulas 

The three component signals are created from an original RGB (red, green and blue) source.

These formulae approximate the conversion between the RGB colour space and YDbDr.

From RGB to YDbDr:

From YDbDr to RGB:

There is also a variety of the PAL broadcasting standard, PAL-N, that uses the YDbDr colour space.

References

Shi, Yun Q. and Sun, Huifang Image and Video Compression for Multimedia Engineering, CRC Press, 2000

See also
YUV - related colour system
PAL-N (Argentina, Paraguay and Uruguay) - some information on PAL-N

Color space